Thomas Eddy Tallmadge (April 24, 1876 – January 1, 1940) was an American architect, best known for his Prairie School works with Vernon S. Watson as Tallmadge & Watson.

Biography
Thomas Eddy Tallmadge was born in Washington, D.C. on April 24, 1876. He was raised in the Chicago suburb of Evanston, graduating from Evanston Township High School. He graduated from the Massachusetts Institute of Technology in 1898 with a bachelor's degree in Architecture. He returned to Chicago to study under Daniel H. Burnham, one of the city's most prominent architects. While working for Burnham, Tallmadge received a scholarship from the Chicago Architectural Club for his work "A Crèche in a Manufacturing District". He used the scholarship to travel through Europe.

Upon his return in 1905, Tallmadge decided to start his own architectural firm with fellow Burnham draftsman Vernon S. Watson. Although Watson was the chief designer, Tallmadge became the face of the firm due to his commitment as a historian and teacher. He taught at the Armour Institute of Technology from 1906 to 1926. Tallmadge is credited for coining the term "Chicago school" in an article for Architectural Review to describe the recent trends in architecture pioneered by Burnham, Louis Sullivan, and others. Tallmadge took sole control over his firm after Watson retired in 1936. Late in his career, Tallmadge focused on publishing books instead of articles, completing three works. In 1940, Tallmadge was killed in an Illinois Central train accident near Arcola, Illinois. He is buried in Graceland Cemetery in Chicago along with many other famed Chicago architects.

Bibliography
The Story of England's Architecture (1934)
The Story of Architecture in America (1936)
Architecture in Old Chicago (1941, published posthumously)

References

Thomas Tallmadge at MIT

1876 births
1940 deaths
20th-century American architects
Accidental deaths in Illinois
American architecture writers
American male non-fiction writers
Burials at Graceland Cemetery (Chicago)
Illinois Institute of Technology faculty
MIT School of Architecture and Planning alumni
Artists from Evanston, Illinois
People from Washington, D.C.
Prairie School architecture
Railway accident deaths in the United States
Chicago school architects